Comedy Showcase was a radio programme which aired BBC Radio 2 between March 1998 and February 2000.  There were nineteen episodes, each of which lasted half an hour.

References 

 Lavalie, John. Comedy Showcase. EpGuides. 21 Jul 2005. 29 Jul 2005  .

BBC Radio 2 programmes